Christopher Howard Conlin (born June 7, 1965) is a former professional American football player and collegiate All-American offensive tackle at Penn State University.

College
Conlin was a three-year starter at Penn State and earned All-America honors in 1986 as a member of the national championship team that defeated Miami, 14-10, in the Fiesta Bowl. He was one of eight finalists for the Outland Trophy that season.

NFL and Arena League
Chosen by the Miami Dolphins in the fifth round of the 1987 NFL Draft, Conlin played 5 injury-plagued seasons in the National Football League, three with the Dolphins (1987–1989) and two with the Indianapolis Colts (1990–1992) before arriving in the Arena Football League, first with the 1993 Miami Hooters and the 1994 Massachusetts Marauders. He would win an ArenaBowl championship with the Tampa Bay Storm in 1995.

Coaching
Conlin was the line coach for the Arizona Rattlers of the Arena Football League, where he produced a #1-ranked rushing defense and #2-ranked scoring defense in 2000. He also served on the coaching staff of the Florida Bobcats in 1996 and 1999 and the New Jersey Red Dogs in 1997.

Personal
Conlin lives in Cooper City, Florida. He is an alumnus of Bishop McDevitt High School in Wyncote, Pennsylvania.  Married to Loretta (Ditter) Conlin.  They have one daughter (Laurin) together.  Their daughter Laurin is a professional bodybuilder.

External links
Chris Conlin's Penn State Nittany Lions 1986 National Championship Football Pennant

1965 births
Living people
American football offensive linemen
Players of American football from Philadelphia
Penn State Nittany Lions football players
Miami Dolphins players
Indianapolis Colts players
Miami Hooters players
Massachusetts Marauders players
Tampa Bay Storm players
Florida Bobcats coaches
People from Cheltenham, Pennsylvania
People from Cooper City, Florida
Arizona Rattlers coaches
Cleveland Gladiators coaches
Sportspeople from Montgomery County, Pennsylvania